Kotiya may refer to:
Sri Lankan leopard
Ghanjah, or kotiya, a type of sailing vessel
One of the exogamous clans of the Nat (Muslim) community of the Indian Subcontinent

See also 
 Kotia (disambiguation)